Ana Sofia Simões Gonçalves (born 9 August 2000), also known as Fifó, is a Portuguese futsal player who plays for Sport Lisboa e Benfica and the Portugal women's national team as a winger.

She was also playing for Italian team Città di Falconara from 2021 to 2022.

International career
In 2018, Gonçalves won the gold medal with the Portugal national team at the Summer Youth Olympic Games and was the top scorer of the tournament with 21 goals.

Later on, Gonçalves was nominated for "Best Female Futsal Player in the World" at the 2018 UMBRO Futsal Awards, where she was third.

In 2019, Gonçalves scored three goals for Portugal at the UEFA Women's Futsal Euro, finishing runner-up to Spain.

Honours
Benfica
Campeonato Nacional Futsal Feminino: 2016–17, 2017–18
Taça de Portugal de Futsal Feminino: 2015–16, 2016–17, 2017–18
Supertaça de Futsal Feminino de Portugal: 2016–17, 2017–18
Città di Falconara
Scudetto: 2021-2022
Coppa Italia: 2021-2022
Supercoppa Italiana: 2021
International
Summer Youth Olympics Gold Medal: 2018
UEFA Women's Futsal Championship: Runner-up 2019
Individual
Summer Youth Olympics Top scorer: 2018
Summer Youth Olympics Best player: 2018

References

2000 births
Living people
Sportspeople from Lisbon
S.L. Benfica futsal players
Portuguese women's futsal players